The genital papilla is an anatomical feature of the external genitalia of some animals.

In mammals

In mammals, the genital papilla is a part of female external genitalia not present in humans, which appears as a small, fleshy flab of tissue. The papilla covers the opening of the vagina.

In fish

In fish, the genital papilla is a small, fleshy tube behind the anus present in some fishes, from which the sperm or eggs are released; the sex of a fish often can be determined by the shape of its papilla.

References

Mammal anatomy
Mammal reproductive system
Fish anatomy